This is the list of fictional characters from the Canadian science fiction television series Strange Days at Blake Holsey High.

Josie Trent
Born on July 28, 1988, Josie Trent (Emma Taylor-Isherwood) is a human whirlwind, skate-punk-girl and the fire behind the Science Club. She is driven by intense curiosity, a determination to rebel against authority, and a need to seem independent. Josie also happens to be very good at science.

Josie has never been close to her mother, Kelly Trent, whose top-secret job drives a wedge between them, and she hasn't been told much about her father. Because of this, she finds it difficult to let her guard down and to trust people. Despite the distance between them, however, mother and daughter do love each other.

Josie's rebellious nature causes a great deal of trouble; it results in frequent conflict with Principal Durst and puts a strain on her friendship with roommate Corrine Baxter. Coupled with her curiosity, Josie's disregard and distrust for authority spurs her on to get to the bottom of the Blake Holsey mystery. She would sacrifice almost anything to discover what Victor Pearson is really up to. However, Josie generally wishes to do good through her actions, to be a hero and not merely a rebel.

She has a volatile relationship with Vaughn Pearson, the son of Victor Pearson. She is pulled by the strings of trust and distrust. Since the Brainwaves episode, Josie's relationship with Lucas Randall has become more complicated. While it's clear that she does care for Lucas at least as a friend, his attempts to sabotage Vaughn irk her. Lucas also has a crush on her.

Josie and Vaughn have been part of the strange things happening around Blake Holsey. After Vaughn was caught with her Chi Ball, Vaughn and Josie had exchanged intelligence and then memories. Vaughn gained enhanced intelligence, but returned it back to Josie with a kiss, when it became apparent he was actually sucking the energy out of her brain - nearly killing her. Josie gained a number of specific memories from Vaughn, including a repressed one from infancy, when Sarah Lynch gave Vaughn a pendant which Victor was to hold onto until the proper time. The pendant was the key to a holographic message to Vaughn that could only be opened using the biometrics of Josie and Vaughn. Josie and Vaughn learned that they have the same DNA helix.

When Josie thought Vaughn went into the wormhole to find his mother, she went after him, but landed in the past, when Blake Holsey High was newly built. She was later rescued by the student Science Club members, but Vaughn was temporarily stranded in 1977. Josie went after him and brought him back to the present. Josie decided to use the wormhole to travel back to the past, before Victor Pearson and Sarah Lynch used the Chi Ball in Pearadyne. Josie took the Chi Ball and returned to the future, hoping something good will come out of it. She was dead wrong. It turned out that Blake Holsey High was abandoned, the students and teachers were gone, and only she was left in this alternate reality of the future of her timeline, observed by the Janitor, and Josie's Clone.

For over a year, Josie was trapped in the alternate world, where she found the pendant that Sarah Pearson left behind in the past. Josie was eventually rescued by her clone, who traded places with her in the universe. Josie returned to her world and learned that Andreas Avenir is her father. She managed to stop him and his evil plot. At the end of everything, Josie meets up with her mother who's very excited to see her.

Corrine Baxter
The daughter of a psychiatrist and a neurosurgeon, Corrine Baxter (Shadia Simmons) enrolled at Blake Holsey High in 2000.

Corrine describes herself in "Wormhole" as a Science Geek with a 172 IQ whose main contributions to the Science Club are her amazing intellect, which she uses to rationalize the weird things that are going on, and her steadying influence in trying to keep the Science Club out of trouble. She considers herself a perfectionist, but her roommate Josie Trent prefers the term "neat freak" – in Corrine's world, there's a place for everything, and if everything is not in its place, there's trouble. Her frequently rigid-seeming personality causes clashes with Josie, who takes a much more relaxed view of neatness, homework, rules and almost everything Corrine stands for. This does not stop them from being best friends, though, and despite the wobbles and upsets, Corrine will usually try to help Josie out whenever she can.

Corrine likes to do things her way, and is not big on compromising her vision - she insists on getting the highest grades and keeping her permanent record clean, and has a very strong competitive streak. However, her respect for authority generally makes her polite and helpful. Corrine appears to put herself under a lot of pressure - she assumes that her parents expect her to be perfect and failing to achieve that will be letting them down. She eventually learns in the episode "Equation" that her parents have no intention of pressuring her directly.

Corrine is the first member of the school's Science Club to enter the wormhole and travel in time. Arriving just before the accidental explosion at Pearadyne Labs, Corrine sees Sarah Lynch behave somewhat ruthlessly in her attempt to get back to the future. To stop Corrine from remembering what she saw, Sarah uses a device to erase that part of her memory. Corrine is then rescued and brought back to the present by Josie Trent and Professor Z.

Although it takes a while for her to admit it, Corrine has a romantic interest in Marshall. When Corrine goes to a mirror universe where Blake Holsey High is a school for the Arts, she shares a kiss with the Marshall of that universe. During this experience she learns that she need not be rigidly "left-brained" in her approach to life.

After Josie's disappearance, Corrine is left without a roommate. Her boyfriend Marshall is also gone, having been taken out of Blake Holsey in the general panic over the missing student. However, Corrine maintains contact with Marshall and consoles with Vaughn Pearson through this time. When she learns that Avenir wants Vaughn to bring him the floating Chi Ball, Corrine takes the ball herself and hides it, hoping to prevent further trouble. However, when Vaughn explains that this is his only chance to find his mother, Corrine gives Vaughn the ball, and asks him not to forget who his friends are. Following Avenir's extermination by Josie, Corrine plans to go to university and possibly backpack through Europe.

Lucas Randall
A bit of a conspiracy theorist, Lucas Randall (Michael Seater) suspects that there is something deeply strange about Blake Holsey High long before his best friend and roommate, Marshall Wheeler, or the third member of the school Science Club, Corrine Baxter. Lucas claims to have once seen a woolly mammoth in the school's swimming pool, but the others don't believe him. Of all the members of the Science Club, Lucas is the most driven in his determination to discover the school's secrets. He is an excellent chess player, but not very good (or at least unlucky) at Hearts.

Lucas is the last person to see Professor Middleton before Middleton disappears at midnight, during which Lucas see a strange light shining through Middleton's door. When Josie Trent arrives at Blake Holsey, she quickly comes up with a theory that Middleton disappeared through a vortex or black hole. They soon discover the wormhole in the science office, after which Lucas starts referring to the school as Black Hole High.

Smart and tall but athletically hopeless, Lucas is regularly picked on by Stew Kubiak and other school bullies. At one point, Lucas is impatient to grow up and no longer have to deal with such indignities – and he gets his wish. Lucas temporarily becomes an adult after being bitten by a mayfly, which has an exceedingly short lifespan. This "adult" Lucas, played by Andrew Tarbet of The Famous Jett Jackson, poses as a substitute math professor, hangs out with Principal Amanda Durst, and even berates Victor Pearson for not treating Durst with more respect.

Lucas lacks confidence in his love life, except during one wormhole-assisted bout of bravery, during which he suavely secures a date with a beautiful new student from Italy, even speaking to her in Italian. However, she is not Lucas's main love interest. Clearly smitten with Josie, Lucas shows considerable jealousy toward Vaughn Pearson, who has an on again, off again relationship with her. This fuels Lucas's suspicion that the younger Pearson is involved in the clandestine activities of his father, Victor Pearson. Nevertheless, Lucas saves Josie and even occasionally Vaughn from disaster. It is Lucas who finds a way to bring Josie back into sync with normal time after her time-slowing watch breaks, and it is Lucas who casts the deciding vote to allow Vaughn to return his mother's pendant to her in the mysterious holographic device from the future.

Most of the time, however, Lucas is highly suspicious of both Vaughn and Victor. Lucas lies about his father's availability in order to stay at Blake Holsey over a school break, so that he can investigate the school, the Pearsons and the wormhole with less interference. During this investigation he finds himself back in Middleton's office, learns of a tesseract device, and sees Middleton's disappearance firsthand. Despite the tesseract incident, Lucas has a good relationship with his own father, and often goes fishing with him when not at school.

After Josie's disappearance, Lucas never gives up on finding her and bringing her home. When Josie's clone allows herself to be trapped in a pocket universe in order to free Josie, Lucas becomes determined to find a way to rescue the clone as well. He eventually decides to become Z's sidekick and stay at Blake Holsey High.

Marshall Wheeler
Marshall Wheeler (Noah Reid) is extremely smart, witty, and enlightened student at Blake Holsey High. He is passionate about science and loyal to his friends. Marshall is also sensitive and compassionate. He has a moral code of his own: he does not mind breaking the rules, however he is against lying and cheating. He believes that the perils and odd occurrences at Blake Holsey are best faced together, rather than different members of the Science Club acting on their own.

Despite this, Marshall sometimes feels unappreciated and ignored by others. On one occasion, these feelings manifest in Marshall becoming invisible. Much of this insecurity stems from his feeling eclipsed by his older brother, Grant Wheeler, who happens to be more popular, talented, good looking, and intelligent than Marshall. When Grant visits the school on the day of his job interview at Pearadyne, Marshall's feelings cause him (and eventually Grant) to take on properties of different elements in their ascending order on the Periodic Table.

A talented musician and keyboard player, Marshall becomes the frontman for the local three-piece rock band Magnet 360. Marshall is also an ambitious entrepreneur, selling modified cell phones and networking computers to raise money for college. Unfortunately, these attempts to earn some cash usually backfire rather badly. Corrine describes him as a person who is especially good at chemistry and somewhat of a hustler, but doesn't talk about his emotions often.

Marshall develops a romantic relationship with Corrine Baxter, but resents it when she tries to overschedule their time together. In another universe where Blake Holsey teaches the fine arts, Marshall's counterpart praises Corrine's "great look", and kisses her before she returns home. The incident teaches her to take a more relaxed, less regimented approach in her relationship with the Marshall of this universe.

After Josie Trent disappears down the wormhole and does not return, Marshall is taken out of Blake Holsey by his parents and placed in another school. However, he still maintains contact with Lucas and Corrine. He returns to visit his friends at their graduation and so is present when Josie returns, he is with his pals when Josie obliterates Avenir. When Corrine contemplates backpacking through Europe before attending university, he suggests that he join her, which Corrine welcomes.

Vaughn Pearson
Born on June 17, 1987, Vaughn Pearson (Robert Clark) is the son of Victor Pearson and Sarah Lynch Pearson, both of whom attended Blake Holsey High before becoming scientists at Pearadyne Labs. His mother disappeared in an explosion at Pearadyne on October 4, 1987, and was presumed dead. Following Sarah's disappearance, Victor brought up Vaughn on his own. Whereas his parents displayed prowess in academic subjects such as science, Vaughn expressed more interest in sports such as football, softball and wrestling. Victor often pressures both Vaughn and the teaching staff of the school to improve Vaughn's performance in all of his subjects, and this may be one of the reasons that his father has almost always kept Vaughn at arm's length. It is unknown whether or not Victor knows that Vaughn suffers from dyslexia.

Vaughn develops into a popular male student at Blake Holsey High, but also something of a bully, making snide remarks in passing about members of the Science Club in particular. Following the arrival of Josie Trent at the school in 2002, Vaughn accidentally peeks at Josie's journal, which mentions suspected wormhole activity on the school grounds, as well as the accident at Pearadyne labs that killed Vaughn's mother. Vaughn informs his father of this, who orders Vaughn to steal Josie's journal and bring it to him. Vaughn reluctantly does so, but it is stolen out of his bag by the Janitor.

Victor then asks Vaughn to join the Science Club to spy on Josie and the other students, and report back to him. Vaughn initially does not like the idea of being a member of the Science Club at all, much less to spy on his classmates. He eventually warms to the Club as he witnesses the interesting consequences of life on top of a wormhole, which he would not have been aware of otherwise. His participation in the Club's activities and discussions, as well as friendships with each of its members, boost his self-esteem.

Longing to learn more about his mother, Vaughn travels through time, using the wormhole, to 1977, followed by Josie. There, Vaughn meets the future Principal Durst, as well as his parents as teenagers, before they met each other. But when he takes something to remind him of his mother, he accidentally creates a grandfather paradox and changes the course of history, as Victor would never meet Sarah, and Vaughn would never be born. Vaughn returns to normal reality when Josie is able to set everything right.

Though he continues to relay conversations that took place in the Science Club, Vaughn develops a friendship with Lucas Randall, as Vaughn admits that he envied Lucas and Marshall Wheeler being roommates. In a show of friendship, Lucas gave him cheat codes to a computer game that they play. Vaughn manages to keep his conflicting feelings about his father and his friends to himself until they manifest as a series of storms directly above his head. As the Science Club come to realize that he is hiding something, Vaughn is forced to admit that he had stolen Josie's journal and told his father about their conversations. Lucas never fully trusts Vaughn again.

Vaughn and Lucas come to a better understanding of each other's lives, however, after they switch bodies as the result of one of Lucas' experiments. They discover and deal with each other's strengths and weaknesses until Marshall and Professor Z fix the device that caused the problem and switch them back. While in Lucas's body, Vaughn is finally able to read easily, without having dyslexia, and shares a kiss with Josie in a scene from Romeo and Juliet.

Vaughn's relationship with Josie later elevates above the platonic level. After a date with Josie, Vaughn insists to his father that Josie is not a threat to him, but Victor reveals the floating Chi Ball, saying that Josie wants it. Vaughn cancels his next date with Josie to learn more about the ball, but Josie uses her time-slowing stopwatch to allow her enough time to switch the floating Ball with the ordinary one from her room. This brings tension and distrust between Vaughn and Josie, as well as the rest of the Science Club (and especially Lucas), as Vaughn neglected to tell them about the Ball. Josie does not learn until her series of "waking dreams", which happen to be Vaughn's memories, that Vaughn was defending her when Victor had showed him the Floating Ball. By that time, Vaughn has moved out of his dormitory and back into his home. He is, however, able to convince Lucas to come back to the Science Club.

On October 4, 2004, the 17th anniversary of the Pearadyne accident, a device comes through a wormhole in the sky and lands on the grounds of Blake Holsey. The device opens when Josie touches it, and is activated when Vaughn touches it. It contains a holographic message from Vaughn's mother, that can only be played when a pendant that she had left for Vaughn shortly before her disappearance is placed in it. Vaughn persuades his reluctant father to give him the pendant without telling him about the device. In her recorded message, Sarah Pearson reveals that she is still alive, and instructs Vaughn to leave the pendant in the device so that she will know that he received the message. Josie suggests that the sender of the device may be an impostor, but Vaughn chooses to follow his mother's instructions.

When Josie is about to leave the school following the disintegration of her relationship with Professor Z after his rapid personality change, Vaughn expresses his true feelings for her in order to make her stay, although it is comments from Principal Durst that finally convince her. Shortly after the problem is resolved, Josie and Vaughn learn that they have the same DNA structure; they both have left-twisting DNA, whereas it is supposed to be right-twisting. This leads to a brief paranoia that the pair of them are related, and they speculate that they may be the only two people in the world with that DNA structure.

Vaughn cannot stop thinking about the possibility that his mother is alive, and eventually begins to pressure Corrine Baxter, who was present at the Pearadyne Labs accident after being sucked through the wormhole, to give him answers. Friction develops between the two, which then causes them to be stuck together due to the strange forces at work in Blake Holsey. Vaughn and Corrine explore the old Pearadyne building, and Corrine recalls a brief encounter with Vaughn's mother. Shortly before her disappearance, Sarah had been arguing with Victor about the dangers involved in the experiment that will transported in the future, which threaten the lives of all the Pearadyne employees, including Victor. She tricks Victor into leaving her during the destruction of Pearadyne, and subsequently uses a device to erase Corrine's memories of what she saw and heard. In other words, she planned to leave her family on purpose, something that Vaughn did not know until that point.

Vaughn's sadness at the revelations about his mother lead Josie to consider that he might enter the wormhole to reach 1987. When Lucas' gravity sensor picks up wormhole activity, she assumes Vaughn has done this and follows him, only to find herself stuck in 1879. Vaughn and the Science Club members track Josie down and come to rescue her, but find themselves being pursued by the authorities. Vaughn allows his friends to travel through the wormhole as he helps Blake Holsey prevent a police officer from entering the room. He dives into the wormhole at the last moment, and arrives in 1977, at a critical point in the history of Pearadyne and Blake Holsey High. Josie returns for him, and they arrive home safely, but Josie made a headstrong decision to try to prevent the Pearadyne accident by stealing back the Chi Ball. When she returns to the present, Blake Holsey High is deserted (and has been since 1987), and Vaughn and the other Science Club members are nowhere to be seen.

However, the regular universe continues without Josie. Vaughn develops a closer friendship with Corrine as his relationship with his father falls apart entirely. Broke and despondent, Victor has lost everything, including, Vaughn thinks, his sanity. Bitter at all the lies, secrets and manipulations of their mutual past, Vaughn turns on his father, and is vulnerable to Andreas Avenir's promise to find Sarah if Vaughn will bring Avenir the Chi Ball. Vaughn is finally reconciled with his father after Josie returns to defeat Avenir, bringing Sarah home in the process.

Professor Noel Zachary
Dubbed "Z" by the science club students, Professor Noel Zachary (Jeffrey Douglas) is the kind of teacher that any student would want. He believes that his students will learn better if he engages their enthusiasm through unconventional teaching methods, rather than relying on straightforward lectures and harsh discipline. Because of this, Principal Durst doesn't exactly like him much.

Noel Zachary grew up without a father, whom he eventually met but who wanted no part of him. As a preteen he played the guitar, but lost interest in it when he discovered a love for science. However, other subjects in school were "a little fuzzy" for him, and he was not at all sure he would be able to attend college. This changed when he received a college scholarship from Pearadyne Industries. Zachary also interned at Pearadyne as a condition of the scholarship. Years later, Victor Pearson personally hired Zachary to teach at Blake Holsey High after the previous teacher, Professor Middleton, mysteriously disappeared.

Like his students, Z is curious to find out what is causing the strange events that always seem to be surrounding the school. Although many of the events that take place in Blake Holsey High are too weird to understand fully, Professor Zachary never forgets to think like a true scientist.

It is revealed during a Semi-Annual Teacher Review, Professor Zachary attended the University of Pennsylvania, graduated magna cum laude, and is proud of his alma mater – to the point of shouting "Go Quakers!" during the review. It is also revealed that his doctoral dissertation is about the modeling of ion implantation induced transient deactivation disjunction activities in Boron.

The floor of Professor Z's office intermittently connects to a wormhole, the probable source of everything strange that happens at the school. Although Professor Z has been through it himself, he cautions the Science Club against exposing themselves to its dangers, preferring to investigate more scientifically and safely by sending a toy called Mr. Bunnypants through the wormhole with a camera attached. After Josie disappears and fails to return, Professor Z forbids anyone from going into his office at all. Following the end of the series, Z stays on at Blake Holsey High in order to study the after side effects of the wormhole's destruction.

Principal Amanda Durst
A veteran science teacher, Principal Amanda Durst (Valerie Boyle) attempts to bring order and discipline to Blake Holsey's chaos, and is a reluctant conspirator in Victor Pearson's activities.

Amanda Durst's career at Blake Holsey High began in 1977, when she became the school's new science professor (portrayed by Lindy Booth). Although she probably did not know this at the time, the floor of her office (which later became Professor Middleton's office, and then Professor Noel Zachary's office) connected to a wormhole. The first student Durst ever "yelled at" was young Victor Pearson. The fact that she enjoyed this set the tone for her tenure as an educator and administrator.

As the school principal, Durst sets a high value on rules, and hands out detention as punishment when students break them. She has a rule book that dates back to the early years of the school, which she expects Professor Zachary and other teachers to help enforce. Some of this strictness has more to do with keeping the school's secrets and preventing disaster than with maintaining order, as when Lucas is shooed away from Middleton's office immediately after Middleton's disappearance, or when Durst makes attendance at a pizza party mandatory to keep students away from an investigation Victor is conducting in front of the school.

Although the members of the school's Science Club tend to think of the principal as an obstacle, someone to punish them if they get caught, there is much more to Amanda Durst than they realize. She is an expert tracker and mountain climber, and like Josie Trent she always hated all the female victims of literature. When her uninhibited side takes over after an experiment in chirality, it becomes clear that she enjoys science and is highly competent as a science professor. Furthermore, she genuinely cares about the students. Even after "Professor D" returns to normal, she takes it upon herself to design an independent study course for Josie, to fuel her "original thoughts." On another occasion, she shows sympathy for Josie's sensitivity to being teased about her height, likening it to her own problems with her weight.

Principal Durst's main problems on the job have less to do with students' misbehavior than with Victor Pearson and the wormhole. As the head of the school's board of directors, Pearson has the power to replace Durst as principal, and has done so on at least one occasion. Also, Durst knows as well as Pearson that the school's future depends on parents and other outsiders not knowing about the strange things that happen at Blake Holsey. This fear of discovery turns out to be well-founded, as Josie's year-long disappearance causes a major drop in enrollment, so that ultimately the school is closed. For these reasons, she reluctantly cooperates with Pearson's secret experiments and investigations, lies about the disappearances of teachers and students, and proclaims, against all evidence to the contrary, that "There is nothing wrong at Blake Holsey High." Victor is less than sympathetic to Amanda's situation, and often threatens or belittles her. Durst tries to relieve this stress by reassuring herself with affirmations, and by talking back to a ball with Victor's face drawn on it. When Lucas Randall temporarily becomes an adult after a mayfly bites him, he becomes aware of Durst's hard work and dedication, and encourages her to have more fun. Posing as a substitute teacher, Lucas also berates Victor for not treating Principal Durst with more respect.

Amanda Durst is not the first person from her family to serve as the school's administrator. When it first opened in 1879 under the name New Chichester Preparatory Academy, Blake Holsey High had a headmistress named Durst, who bore a striking resemblance to the present-day principal.

Victor Pearson
Bald, ruthless and seemingly untrustworthy, Victor Pearson (Lawrence Bayne) resembles Lex Luthor in DC Comics and Lionel Luthor in Smallville. Victor is the head of the Blake Holsey school board, and exerts a great deal of coercive influence over Principal Amanda Durst. He is the father of Vaughn, husband of Sarah, ex-colleague of Kelly Trent, and nemesis of Josie Trent.

Victor was once a nice, inventive, and nerdy student at Blake Holsey High (portrayed by David Reale). He was in love with Sarah Lynch. Victor stole Josie Trent's Floating Chi Ball when she followed Vaughn through the wormhole to 1978. This pleased Sarah, who turned out to be a time traveler herself. Victor eventually married Sarah, and Sarah gave birth to Vaughn. At the culmination of the couple's time travel experiments using the Chi Ball, when Sarah was to leave the present to return to the future, she left Victor with a pendant to give to Vaughn.

Victor always had a plan and was known to work on secret projects that would seem dangerous. He used the mysterious Chi Ball to power his devices. The Science Club was deeply suspicious of Victor's activities, and often investigated or interfered with them. Victor attempted to use Vaughn to learn information from the Science Club, but Vaughn decided not to spy for him. Distrust between father and son grew, as Vaughn demanded the pendant with no explanation, and Victor failed to explain that his experiments were largely directed at finding Sarah and bringing her home. Nor did Victor tell his son that Vaughn's signature on certain financial documents was the only way to continue to fund this effort.

A year after Josie went missing, Victor had lost his fortune and seemingly become a madman, still driven to continue his search for Sarah but lacking a means to do so. It was not until Josie's clone returned and openly supported Victor's efforts that the Science Club learned that Victor was not the villain, they had assumed him to be.

The Janitor
An all-knowing figure at Blake Holsey High. The Janitor (Tony Munch), like Josie's clone, was transported to some era through a wormhole due to the explosion at Pearadyne. He knows what is to happen and is supportive of Josie Trent. He always seems to help Josie at the time she needs it most, yet at the same time confuses her with his all-knowing. Josie, however, loses her trust in him when in one episode where Vaughn, instead of returning to the present, is sent to 1977. When she returns through the black hole for him, the janitor refuses to tell her where Vaughn is. He is cryptic and intends to not stray from the point, making sure that his true identity and reason for being remains with him and only him. He exists outside of time and intends to keep the timeline in clean and perfect order, without letting anyone know, outside of the Science Club, about the Wormhole in the Science Office. No one seems to know his name.

For most of the series, the Janitor is morally ambiguous. This ambiguity is resolved in "Conclusions" when Josie's clone reveals that the Janitor is an observer of observers. The observers are a people to guard and maintain the time stream against those who would manipulate time travel and alter history for their own ends. While the Josie Clone was also trained as an observer when the Janitor took her to the future it is made clear in "Conclusions" that he is from a much more distant point in the future and acts as the observer of the other observers. When the series concludes he reveals that he will never be able to return to his home and that it is his sacrifice.

Messages
Season one
 Shrink: The greatest threat to Victor...

Season two
 Wormhole2: ...is Josie.
 Pheromones: Josie's future will be difficult. Remember the words...Josie will change the world. Change is good.
 Cold: Tyler will become a threat to them all. The school is not cured.
 Genome: Josie and Vaughn's destinies are written. The slides forecast the future.
 Brainwaves: The papers are linked to Vaughn's mother and Pearadyne. Lucas's loss is Vaughn's gain.
 Chemistry: The brother cannot be trusted.
 Ecosystem: Josie and Corrine know each other well. Josie will find what she's looking for.
 Technology: Marshall must beware. Tyler will cause even more trouble in the future.
 Equation: Corrine is a danger to Marshall.
 Hemispheres: Left is right, right is left.
 Nutrition: Only Josie can save Vaughn.
 Echolocation: Victor is closer than anyone thinks.
 Stopwatch: When time stops, a mysterious visitor arrives.

Season Three
 Transference: As one grows more powerful, the other grows weaker. Disorder must be remedied. More is transferred than is known.
 Nocturnal: In dreams, truth is spoken. A memory shared brings reconciliation. That left behind will be found and returned.
 Allure: She grows from attention. A deadly rival arrives. Not to be forgotten.
 Tesseract: Jealousy leads to disarray. The same mistake will not be made twice. He who was lost returns.
 Camouflauge: The face of a friend is their foe. A secret is discovered. One leaves.
 Nanotechnology: One rival reaches out to another. Deception leads to danger. The true enemy is revealed.
 Vision: Trust is broken. The key is found. One prepares for his destiny.
 Hologram: The sky delivers a mystery. The key is used. An image of the past appears.
 Probability: The future is told. The impossible becomes probable. Lives are endangered.
 Chirality: Left is right, right is left. Rebellion leads to betrayal. The two are alike.
 Friction: Two share a connection. Memory is restored. One is not what was believed.
 Past: The experiments begin anew. The enemy is seen. One is lost.
 Inquiry: Interference with an important event causes chaos. When trust is broken, all is lost. Everything happens for a reason.

Sarah Lynch Pearson
Sarah Lynch Pearson (Jenny Levine) was born on January 16, 1961. She attended Blake Holsey High in 1977 (portrayed by Michele Popovich). She developed a romantic relationship with Victor Pearson, another student at the school. Like the Janitor and Mr. Avenir, she had knowledge of significant events that had not yet occurred, especially when Victor had taken the Floating Ball away from Josie Trent, a future student at Blake Holsey who had travelled in time from 2004 using a wormhole located in the school's science office.

Sarah and Victor later married, and she gave birth to their first son, Vaughn.

She disappeared in the explosion at Pearadyne Labs on October 4, 1987, and was presumed dead. Prior to her disappearance, she had been to see Vaughn as a baby, and told her son that what she and his father were doing would change the world for the better. She also left him a pendant for him to learn the use of it. Vaughn, who was brought up by Victor, would follow in his parents' footsteps by attending Blake Holsey High.

On October 4, 2004, the anniversary of the Pearadyne accident, a wormhole opened above the grounds of Blake Holsey High, depositing a device that contained a holographic message from a woman claiming to be Sarah Pearson. The message could only be accessed by using the pendant, which Vaughn, who was present at the time along with other members of the Blake Holsey Science Club (including Josie Trent), had to retrieve from his father's safe quickly. The message contained a request to insert the pendant into the device before it automatically sent itself back through another wormhole, so that she knew that her son had received the message. Vaughn's friends at the Science Club considered the possibility that the message had been sent by an impostor, but it was eventually decided that the pendant must return with the device.

Corrine Baxter, a student at Blake Holsey from 2000 onwards and member of the Science Club, was present at the Pearadyne Labs accident after being sucked through the wormhole in the science office. Until soon after viewing Sarah's hologram message, she had believed that her time in 1987 had lasted a couple of minutes at most, but after Vaughn enquired about what else she could recall, memories surfaced of a brief encounter with Vaughn's mother. Shortly before her disappearance, Sarah had been arguing with Victor about her plans to open a way to be transported in the future, which would endanger the lives of all the Pearadyne employees, including Victor. She was so ambitious that she claimed the entire project as her own, and had tricked Victor into leaving her during the destruction of Pearadyne. She used a device to erase Corrine's memories of what she saw and heard. In other words, she planned to leave her family on purpose.

Others
 Emma Taylor-Isherwood and Sally Taylor-Isherwood as Josie's clone – Accidentally created from Josie's DNA in a piece of chewing gum using energy from the wormhole, Josie's clone possesses average human intelligence with an enlightened personality. Unlike the original Josie, she likes to keep things neat. The Janitor sends her through a wormhole in the basement to the future, where she trains to be a time traveling "observer." A year later, when Josie steals the Qi Ball away from Victor Pearson, the clone intervenes and returns it to Victor, reminding him that he has the ball for a reason. She knows how the past and the future are supposed to happen, and, like the Janitor, she hangs around to make sure nothing disrupts the future. Josie's clone also returns after Tyler Jessop went through the wormhole, and when Vaughn finds out about Sarah and Victor. The clone and the Janitor are able to exist outside of time, for when reality changes, they retain their memories of the event; however, they might not be able to return to the future from which they came. At the end of "Conclusions", the clone Josie is trapped in a parallel timeline, having traded places with the original Josie so that the original Josie could return and fulfill her destiny. However, it is implied that some hope remains for rescuing the clone, Josie.
 Steve Jackson as Professor Middleton, Professor Zachary's immediate predecessor as Blake Holsey's science teacher. On the night before Josie arrives at Blake Holsey, Professor Middleton disappears into the wormhole located in his office, an event that is witnessed by only Lucas. When the school begins to fold upon itself like a tesseract, a future Lucas arrives in the science teacher's office right before Middleton disappears through the wormhole and briefly witnesses himself in the past. Middleton seems to know much more of what is to happen around Blake Holsey, and tries to warn future Lucas about the Pearsons and the agents of the future.
 Christopher Tai as Tyler Jessop, an arrogant bully at Blake Holsey High. Tyler is a show-off and has beliefs of self-importance (due to his older brother being a highly successful executive, and the senior students considering him one of them). Rather than using physical force like Stew Kubiak, Tyler instead uses his influence among the seniors and presence to get his own way and became a recurring antagonist for Marshall in particular. Tyler is also a womanizer, and has an attraction for Josie. Tyler, at one point, became curious of the Science Club's dealings with the wormhole, and, after its energy granted him the ability to alter his physical form (to anyone else's) and camouflage himself (to the point no-one could see him) he successfully found and journeyed through the wormhole. Though Tyler was only gone a few seconds, Tyler went to many places in both the past and future, learning a great deal about future events. A side-effect of the journey caused him to lose his shape-changing ability, though he retained his camouflage. After this, Tyler repeatedly went out into the forest, and spoke to voices in the sky (implied to be Avenir), and then left Blake Holsey to accept an internship at the Avenir Institute to aid in Avenir's plans to gain power.
 Lori Hallier as Doctor Kelly Trent, Josie's mother, and is a physicist and engineer in the employ of secret organizations, causing her to be moved around a lot. Perhaps inevitably, Kelly sent Josie to Blake Holsey High. Josie's repeated separations with her mother have left her somewhat estranged with her, though they care about each other and gradually repair their relationship as time goes on. Kelly is at one point recruited by Victor Pearson into Pearadyne II, but her motives are as ambiguous as Victor's. At various times she appears to be working both for and against Victor, making it difficult to discern whether she is a friend or enemy. At the end of "Conclusions", it is revealed Avenir is Josie's father, having, years ago, (regretfully) deceived Kelly into working against Victor. She eventually turned against Avenir, but not before the two conceived Josie. When Josie returns from the parallel timeline and defeats Avenir, Kelly is reunited with her daughter.
 Dru Viergever as Stewart Kubiak, a star athlete, usually referred to simply as "Kubiak" or "Stew". He often bullies Lucas and mocks the Science Club's activities. He isn't so smart, but will sometimes surprise the science class with unexpected knowledge. On one such occasion, he revealed an understanding of why chameleons change colors, explaining that, "I had a pet chameleon once. His name was Rainbow".
 Talia Schlanger as Madison, a stuck-up cheerleader and student at Blake Holsey High. She has been known to be very mean and snobby toward Josie. She frequently tries to get Vaughn's attention and was the previous Student Council President.
 Liam Titcomb as Will, plays in Magnet 360, Marshall Wheeler's band. A student at Blake Holsey.
 Marc Devlin as Jarrod, plays in Magnet 360. A student at Blake Holsey.
 Aaron Poole as Grant Wheeler, Marshall's popular older brother and a former student at Blake Holsey High. He and Marshall have a strained relationship, each apparently misperceiving his brother's understanding of him; Marshall believes that he has been living in Grant's successful shadow while Grant has envied Marshall's natural tendency to find true friends who see him for who he actually is. Grant later works for Victor Pearson at Pearadyne II.
 Rothaford Gray as Coach Kennedy, a physical education teacher at Blake Holsey High.
 John Ralston as Andreas Jack Avenir. Avenir is the mysterious benefactor of Blake Holsey High, somehow appearing in very different eras in the school's history. Avenir was responsible for commissioning the construction of the school, based on his own explicit (yet unusual) design, and was aware of the existence of the wormhole and Josie's identity when she arrived from the future, and later manipulates the architect's son and one of the students; Blake Holsey, into becoming headmaster of the school. A century later, Tyler Jessop is sent as an intern to the Avenir Institute, to somehow aid Avenir in his plans. In "Conclusions", Avenir is revealed to have assumed Victor Pearson's position on the school's board of governors, and then announced the school's closure. When Josie returns from the parallel timeline, Avenir is waiting to greet her, and reveals that he is her biological father. A rogue observer from the future, he has attempted to gain power over the universe by manipulating the existing timeline; with each failure, he has returned to various points in time to make adjustments and try again. Avenir attempts to convince Josie to help him, though she refuses and appears to have destroyed him in the series finale.

References

Strange Days at Blake Holsey High
Strange Days at Blake Holsey High